Maconochie was a British stew of sliced turnips, carrots, potatoes, onions, haricot beans, and beef in a thin broth, named after the Aberdeen-based Maconochie Company that produced it. It gained recognition as a widely-issued military ration for British soldiers during the Boer War and World War I. There was also a French version called Maconóochie.

Though the stew was tolerable, most soldiers detested it.  As one soldier put it, "warmed in the tin, Maconochie was edible; cold, it was a man-killer." Others complained about how the potatoes appeared to be unidentifiable black lumps. The congelation of fat above indistinguishable chunks of meat and vegetables led one reporter to describe it as "an inferior grade of garbage". A soldier named Calcutt claimed "the Maconochie's stew ration gave the troops flatulence of a particularly  offensive nature." 

Some product versions that contained turnips were said to possess an unpleasant smell when combined with beans. Barbara Buchan from the Fraserburgh Heritage Centre confirmed that their records contain only a single positive response to the product.

See also
 List of stews
 Potted meat food product

Notes and references

External links
 Trench Food
 Glossary of Australian military jargon of World War I
 Replicas of World War I artifacts, including cans of Maconochie

Military food of the United Kingdom
Canned food
Meat stews